Alberto Viller Bica Alonso (11 February 1958 – 22 August 2021) was a Uruguayan footballer who played as a right winger. He played in nine matches for the Uruguay national team from 1979 to 1981. He was also part of Uruguay's squad for the 1979 Copa América tournament.

Bica died on 22 August 2021, aged 63, after living with leukemia for 16 years.

References

External links
 

1958 births
2021 deaths
Footballers from Montevideo
Uruguayan footballers
Association football wingers
Uruguay international footballers
Deaths from cancer in Uruguay